Elvin Penner is a Belizean politician who served in the House of Representatives from 2008 to 2015 representing the Cayo North East constituency. He is a member of the United Democratic Party. Penner was the first Belizean Mennonite elected to national office.

Penner was initially appointed as Minister of Natural Resources and the Environment in 2008. Following a cabinet reshuffling in March 2009, Penner transitioned to the Ministry of Public Utilities, Information and Broadcasting. After being re-elected in 2012, Penner was appointed Minister of State in the Ministry of National Security (with responsibility for immigration and border protection).

Passport scandal

On 19 September 2013, Penner was stripped of his ministerial portfolios by Prime Minister Dean Barrow due to his involvement in allegedly selling and issuing a fraudulent Belizean passport to South Korean national Kim Won Hong, who at the time was jailed in Taiwan.  Penner was charged with illegally facilitating a passport in March 2014, but charges were dropped in July due to lack of evidence.

After the scandal Penner was shunned in the Belize House and reportedly did not carry out any official government duties. He resisted calls to resign from both the Belize House and the UDP by Barrow and others.

In 2013 Penner was the subject of a recall petition in his constituency. However the petition was declared invalid in January 2014. In June 2014 Penner was deselected as the UDP's candidate in Cayo North East in the 2015 general election in favour of former San Ignacio Mayor John August. At that election August was defeated by the People's United Party candidate, Orlando Habet.

Personal

Penner is of Canadian ancestry. He has three children, one daughter and two sons.

References

Year of birth missing (living people)
Living people
People from Cayo District
Belizean people of Canadian descent
Belizean Mennonites
United Democratic Party (Belize) politicians
Government ministers of Belize
Members of the Belize House of Representatives for Cayo North East